"Everybody Move" is a song by British dance-pop singer-songwriter Cathy Dennis, released as the fifth single from her debut album, Move to This (1990). Co-written by Dennis, it was a top-30 hit in the UK, peaking at number 25. Additionally, it also reached number 90 on the US Billboard Hot 100 and number 41 on the Billboard Hot Dance Club Play chart. In Australia, the single peaked at number 85, while on the Eurochart Hot 100, it reached number 58 in January 1992.

Critical reception
Alex Henderson from AllMusic felt that Dennis is "warm and convincing on such sleek and infectious dance-floor fare", as "Everybody Move". Larry Flick from Billboard wrote, "After the soft and pleasing "Too Many Walls", Dennis returns to her dance roots for an instantly contagious pop/house twirler. Already racking up club adds, fourth shot from hit-packed Move to This debut album sounds like another sure-fire multiformat smash." Marc Andrews from Smash Hits noted that here, the singer "returns to more familiar ground with this dance stormer a la Vogue ('tis the season obviously). And, good news ahoy, it seems certain to provide Cathy from Norwich with the fifth hit from her five-hits-from-the-one-LP".

Music video
A music video was produced to promote the single, directed by Scottish television comedy director and producer Bob Spiers.

Track listings
 UK CD single
 "Everybody Move" (Everybody's Club Mix)
 "Everybody Move" (Padapella)
 "Everybody Move" (Everybody's House Mix)
 "Everybody Move" (Everybody's House Music)

Charts

References

1990 songs
1991 singles
Cathy Dennis songs
House music songs
Polydor Records singles
Songs written by Cathy Dennis
Songs written by Terry Britten